In military history, the German term  (pl. ; abbrev.

Nature
The Kampfgruppe was an ad hoc combined arms formation, usually employing a combination of tanks, infantry, and artillery (including anti-tank) elements, generally organised for a particular task or operation.

A Kampfgruppe could range in size from a company to a corps , but the most common was an Abteilung (battalion)-sized formation. Kampfgruppen were generally referred to by either their commanding officer's name or the parent division.

Application

First World War
The Stormtroopers (in German Stoßtruppen, shock troops, literally "punch/push troops") were specialist military troops which were formed in the last years of World War I as the German army developed new methods of attacking enemy trenches, called "infiltration tactics". Men trained in these methods were known in German as Sturmmann (literally "assault man" but usually translated as Stormtrooper), formed into companies of Sturmtruppen (Storm Troops). Other armies have also used the term "assault troops", "shock troops" or fire teams for specialist soldiers who perform the infiltration tasks of stormtroopers.

Second World War
With respect to their ad hoc nature and objective-oriented strategy, Finnish ski troops  employed during the Soviet-Finnish Winter War of 1939-1940 could, in principle, be considered to be an equivalent to Kampfgruppen. However, given the poor equipment of the Finnish forces, the combined-arms aspect of the Kampfgruppen could not have been applied.  In the Continuation War (1941–44) battle groups (Finnish: taisteluosasto) were commonly used by Finns and were now bigger having not only infantry but artillery and anti-tank units under commander of battle group.  In many cases there were several units of different regiments, brigades and divisions in same battle group.  For instance in June 1944 Battle group (Taisteluosasto) Ehrnrooth (commander of 7th Regiment) consisted: I/7th Regiment, III/7th Regiment, III/6th Regiment (minus its 9th inf company), fortification battalion 4, II/field artillery Regiment 19, light field artillery battalion 24, heavy artillery battalion 20 and heavy artillery battalion 27. For few days regiment commander had more firepower under his command than ordinary infantry division commander. Finnish battle groups were relatively short period ad hoc but very common phenomena especially in 1941 and 1944. Field artillery and even anti aircraft artillery units created their own artillery battle groups.

Examples
Hundreds of Kampfgruppen are documented to have taken part in operations ranging from a few days to over a year during the war. They left a significant impact in the popular culture and the picture of the Second World War. Famous examples include:

Kampfgruppe Peiper was a mechanised brigade-sized formation formed under the command of SS-Standartenführer Joachim Peiper which took part in the 1944 Battle of the Bulge.  KG Peiper was to be the striking arm of the 1st SS Panzer Division Leibstandarte SS Adolf Hitler.
Kampfgruppe Das Reich was a regiment-sized formation formed from the remaining combat-ready elements of the 2nd SS Panzer Division Das Reich which was encircled in the Kamenets-Podolsky pocket in early 1944.
Kampfgruppe 1001 Nacht was a German Kampfgruppe formed on the Oder front during the final German offensive of the Second World War. The formation is most notable for its unusual title, referring to the medieval Persian book of 1001 Nights, a collection of tales and fables.
 During the Allied invasion of France Major Hans von Luck took command of the 125th Panzergrenadier Regiment of the 21st Panzer Division, stationed near Caen, France.

Panzerkampfgruppe (Late War) 
A panzerkampfgruppe was effectively the main striking force of a panzer division. The usual panzerkampfgruppe organization consisted of 1 tank battalion,1 panzergrenadier battalion, and 1 self-propelled artillery battalion for a well rounded mobile fighting force. It was common for a mobile engineer company to also be attached to the panzerkampfgruppe.

Flak-kampftrupps (Late War) 
Flak-kampftrupps were mixed units which combined two or more heavy Flak pieces and light auto-cannons.

Other services
While the original concept of Kampfgruppe is usually reserved to the land warfare, some German tacticians and strategists applied it also for naval warfare.  The most obvious change was the design (units were usually earmarked for operation in advance instead of being organized ad hoc) and the type of units involved (instead of combined arms, different classes of naval vessels were employed). The examples include German Kampfgruppe 5 employed during Operation Weserübung. This unit consisted of the heavy cruiser Blücher, the heavy cruiser Lützow, the light cruiser Emden, 3 torpedo boats and 8 minesweepers carrying 2,000 troops to Oslo.

During the Second World War Luftwaffe, Kampfgeschwader bomber units consisted of several Kampfgruppen, which in terms of size were situated somewhere between squadrons and groups of Anglo-American air forces.

Post-War influence

Currently, the formation closest in use is US Army Task force or the battlegroup formation used by several NATO countries, notably the UK and Norway. The Norwegian borderstation Korpfjell still use the German name Kampfgruppe Korpfjell.

See also
 Kampfgruppen der Arbeiterklasse (KdA) or in English "Combat Groups of the Working Class" were a paramilitary organisation in East Germany, founded in 1953 and abolished in 1990. It numbered about 400,000 for much of its existence.
 Marching regiment

Notes and references

Ad hoc units and formations
Military doctrines
Military units and formations of the Wehrmacht
German words and phrases